Kilifarevo Island is an ice-free island in the Aitcho group on the west side of English Strait in the South Shetland Islands, Antarctica. Extending , surface area . The area was visited by early 19th century sealers.

Kilifarevo Island is named after the town of Kilifarevo in northern Bulgaria.

Location
Bulgarian mapping in 2009.

See also 
 Composite Gazetteer of Antarctica
 List of Antarctic islands south of 60° S
 SCAR
 Territorial claims in Antarctica

Notes

References
 Kilifarevo Island. SCAR Composite Antarctic Gazetteer
 Bulgarian Antarctic Gazetteer. Antarctic Place-names Commission. (details in Bulgarian, basic data in English)

External links
 Kilifarevo Island. Adjusted Copernix satellite image

Islands of the South Shetland Islands
Bulgaria and the Antarctic